Cobb may refer to:

People
 Cobb (surname), a list of people and fictional characters with the surname Cobb
 Cobb Rooney (1900–1973), American professional football running back

Places

New Zealand
 Cobb River
 Cobb Reservoir
 Cobb Power Station

United Kingdom
 The Cobb, the harbour wall in Lyme Regis, England

United States
 Cobb, California, a census designated place
 Cobb, former name of Pine Grove, Lake County, California
 Cobb Mountain, California
 Cobb County, Georgia
 Cobb, Georgia, an unincorporated community
 Cobb, Indiana, an unincorporated town
 Cobb, Kentucky, an unincorporated community
 Cobb, Oklahoma, an unincorporated community
 Cobb Peak (Idaho)
 Cobb Peak, Tooele County, Utah
 Cobb River (Minnesota)
 Cobb, St. Clair County, Missouri, an unincorporated community
 Cobb, Stoddard County, Missouri, an unincorporated community
 Cobb, Texas, an unincorporated community
 Mount Cobb, Washington County, Vermont, Vermont
 Cobb Town, Wisconsin, an unincorporated community
 Cobb, West Virginia, an unincorporated community
 Cobb, Wisconsin, a village
 Fort Cobb, a US Army fort established in 1859 in what is now Caddo County, Oklahoma

Elsewhere
 Mount Cobb (British Columbia), Canada
 Cobb Seamount, an underwater volcano 500 km (310 mi) west of Gray's Harbor, Washington
 Cobb hotspot, a volcanic hotspot off the Oregon/Washington coast

Buildings
 Cobb Building (Wagoner, Oklahoma), on the National Register of Historic Places in Oklahoma
 Cobb Building (Seattle, Washington), on the National Register of Historic Places listings in Washington state
 Cobb House (disambiguation), various houses on the National Register of Historic Places
 Cobb Stadium, a multi-purpose stadium on the University of Miami campus in Coral Gables, Florida

Roads
 Cobb Highway, New South Wales, Australia
 Cobb Parkway, Cobb County, Georgia

Other uses
 Cob (material), or cobb, a building material for making walls using compacted clay, sand and straw
 Cobb (film), a 1994 film about Ty Cobb
 Cobb (soundtrack)
 Cobb, today Cobb-Vantress, a brand of commercial broiler chicken
 CobB, a bacterial protein
 Cobb & Co, the name of many Australian coaching businesses
 Cobb & Co. (New Zealand), a 19th-century operator of a fleet of stagecoaches
 Cobb baronets, an extinct title in the Baronetage of England
 Cobb Divinity School, a former graduate school
 Cobb Field, a baseball park in Billings, Montana
 Cobb lettuce or Boston lettuce, a variety of lettuce
 Cobb salad, a chopped salad named for Robert Howard Cobb
 Cobb Surgical elevator, an orthopedic surgical instrument used to scrape bone
 USCGC Cobb (WPG-181), a US Coast Guard cutter

See also
 Cob (disambiguation)
 Cobb angle, a system of measuring spine deformities
 Cobbs, surname
 Cobbs Creek, Delaware County, Pennsylvania
 Cobb's Legion, a Confederate unit in the American Civil War
 1st Kentucky Artillery, also known as Cobb's Battery, a Confederate unit
 Kob, an antelope